The 2006 Sony Ericsson Bangalore Open was a Tier 3 Women's WTA Tennis Tournament held in Bangalore, Karnataka, India from 13 - 19 February 2006.

Entrants

Seeds

Other entrants
The following players received entry from the qualifying draw:
  Katarína Kachlíková
  Daniela Kix
  Alla Kudryavtseva
  Tatiana Poutchek

The following players received wildcards into the main draw
  Ankita Bhambri
  Rushmi Chakravarthi
  Isha Lakhani

Finals

Singles

 Mara Santangelo defeated  Jelena Kostanić, 3–6, 7-6(7–5), 6–3

Doubles

 Liezel Huber /  Sania Mirza defeated  Anastasia Rodionova /  Elena Vesnina, 6–3, 6–3

References

2006 in Indian tennis
2007 WTA Tour
Bangalore Open